Sarilamak is a town in Lima Puluh Kota Regency, of West Sumatra province of Indonesia and it is the administrative seat (capital) of Lima Puluh Kota Regency.

Populated places in West Sumatra
Regency seats of West Sumatra